Chesham tube station is a London Underground station in Chesham, Buckinghamshire, United Kingdom. It was opened on 8 July 1889 by the Metropolitan Railway (MR). It is the terminus station of the Chesham branch of the Metropolitan line, which runs from Chalfont & Latimer. The station, a Grade II listed building, is in London fare Zone 9 (previously zone D).

It is both the northernmost and westernmost station in the system.

History
The line had been intended to extend to Tring railway station with connections to the London and North Western Railways West Coast Main Line. However, before work was begun, the MR chose an alternative route across the Chilterns via Aylesbury. The line to Chesham was retained as a branch from the new route and construction began in late 1887. Although the MR continued to buy land between Chesham and Tring for some years after the station's opening, the route was never extended further. The station building complex has remained almost unchanged.

The station originally had a goods yard, which closed in July 1966. The goods yard site by 1994 was the car park for the station and a Waitrose supermarket. When the line was electrified a bay platform was added, but proved unnecessary and closed in November 1970.

On 16 and 17 August 2014 the branch line celebrated its 125th anniversary of operating. It was celebrated using London Underground's first steam locomotive, Metropolitan 1.

Grade II listed building
The station is a Grade II listed building. The reasons for listing the station at this level were:
 Architectural interest: the most complete surviving example of a late-C19 rural Metropolitan station
 Historic interest: a vivid reminder of the Metropolitan Railway's early expansion into London's rural hinterland
 Ensemble value: the station building, signal box and water tower form an unusually coherent and intact group.

Services

Since 12 December 2010, Chesham has had an 8-car train every 30 minutes direct to Aldgate. In the morning and evening peak, trains run non-stop between Moor Park and Harrow-on-the-Hill, then calling at Finchley Road and all stations to Aldgate. For Chesham residents this is a major improvement, as previously Chesham was served in the off-peak solely by a 4-car shuttle train to Chalfont & Latimer, where passengers had to change onto a train to or from Amersham. Although the reasons for the new service pattern were largely technical (the S8 Stock, while designed as two four-car trains, cannot be split into four-car trains as they have driving cabs only at the outer end of each unit), it was expected to ease congestion on local roads by increasing Chesham's attractiveness to park-and-ride commuters.

Gallery

Notes

References

Bibliography

External links

 Transport for London,
 Chesham Town Council

Metropolitan line stations
Tube stations in Buckinghamshire
Former Metropolitan and Great Central Joint Railway stations
Railway stations in Great Britain opened in 1889
Single platform tube stations
Chesham
Grade II listed buildings in Buckinghamshire